H. W. Wilson could refer to: 

Herbert Wrigley Wilson (1866-1940), British journalist and naval historian
Halsey William Wilson (1868-1954), American publisher and bibliographer
H. W. Wilson Company, American publisher and indexing company founded by Halsey William Wilson
Herbert Ward Wilson (1877-1955), Australian science lecturer and naturalist